George Cox Kahekili Keʻeaumoku II or Keʻeaumoku ʻOpio (1784–1824) was part of an influential family at the time of the founding of the Kingdom of Hawaii. he served as a military leader, and then became a convert to Christianity and Royal Governor of Maui. He is sometimes called Keʻeaumoku III if Keʻeaumoku Nui is counted as Keʻeaumoku I and Keʻeaumoku Pāpaʻiahiahi is counted Keʻeaumoku II instead.

Life 
He was born probably in 1784. His father was Keʻeaumoku Pāpaʻiahiahi (1736–1804), a noble from Hawaiʻi Island, and his mother was Nāmāhānaʻi Kaleleokalani, the wife of her half-brother the King of Maui, Kamehameha Nui. From his mother he was a related to many of the kings of Maui.

His father had been a counsellor and supporter of Kamehameha I during his early years. As the eldest son of Keʻeaumoku, he succeed his father as a counsellor during the last years of Kamehameha's campaigns in 1804. He was appointed governor of Maui and adjacent islands of Molokaʻi, Lānaʻi and Kahoʻolawe by Kamehameha I, also taking over for his father. Some early writers spell his name "Keaumoku". He served as Commander and Admiral of the King's Fleet and fought in the Battle of Nu'uanu along with Isaac Davis.

His siblings became notable leaders in various roles. His older sister Kaʻahumanu became a Queen consort of Kamehameha I, and after Kamehameha I's death served as Queen Regent. Another older sister Queen Kalākua Kaheiheimālie, and a younger sister Lydia Namahana Piʻia also became royal wives. Younger brother Kalua-i-Konahale Kuakini took the name "John Adams" and became Royal Governor of Hawaiʻi island.

As the custom with royalty of the time, he took multiple wives. His first two were Kekuauaea and Akahi, the aunt who later willed her vast lands to Bernice Pauahi Bishop.
Around 1821 he became the first husband of Grace Kamaʻikuʻi Young when she was in her teens, later the foster mother of Emma Rooke.

His reputation for extracting as much tax as the commoners could bear led to his nickname Puʻu Nui ("Great Pile"). The name refers to the rotting piles of excess goods outside his storehouses.
In the true Hawaiian double entendre, the name also accurately described his physique: members of his family were known to be enormous.

He took the name "Cox", after the first British sea captain to befriend him, Harold Cox, and "George" after King King George IV. He was usually called "Governor Cox" by foreigners. He learned English, and considered a friend of the European and American traders. The Maui port of Lāhainā became a popular port of call for whaling ships in his tenure, and served as capital of the kingdom 1820–1845. Captain Harold Cox would marry into Hawaiian royalty, and his daughter would marry Chief Hoʻolulu, another former Kamehameha advisor.

He was among the first to house the Protestant missionaries that had arrived from Boston in 1820. His knowledge of English made him a valuable interpreter. He attended public worship and collected the people together by ringing a large bell. They devised a writing system and he quickly learned to read and write.

The first printing was done in a grass-roofed hut in Honolulu at the site that is now Kawaiahaʻo Church in the afternoon of January 7, 1822. The lever to begin the printing process was pulled by Keʻeaumoku in the presence of Elisha Loomis, printer; the reverend Hiram Bingham; and James Hunnewell, mission benefactor. This first printing was the beginning of the Mission Press, which eventually printed millions of pages, most in the Hawaiian language.

An English visitor in 1821 gives the following account of Keʻeaumoku II:

Illness and death 
He suffered frequent attacks of disease in the last years. The illness which immediately preceded his dissolution was painful, and somewhat protracted. At first some of the chiefs believed him to be suffering from sorcery. He was brought to the island of Oahu to be treated by foreign physicians. It was there missionary William Ellis visited him daily and sometimes observed him praying. He wished to be baptized on his deathbed. Ellis thought it proper to decline, or he and the Hawaiians would think there was a saving efficacy connect to that Christian rite or that it would secure the soul's acceptance with God. He died at Pakaka in Honolulu, Oahu on March 23, 1824. His brother Kuakini had his body moved back by ship to Kailua-Kona on the night of his death, leaving Reverend Bingham to conduct his funeral service over an empty coffin. A funeral was held in Kuakini's house where the chiefs gathered to mourn and the Reverend Asa Thurston and Bishop attended prayers for him.

Ancestry

References

Further reading 

  (Historical novel)

External Resources 
The Hawaiian Imprint Collection From the Library of Congress has the first publications from the island which were printed from Missionary Elisha Loomis' printing press.

1784 births
1824 deaths
Royalty of the Hawaiian Kingdom
House of Kekaulike
Converts to Christianity from pagan religions
Hawaiian Kingdom Protestants
Hawaiian Kingdom politicians
Native Hawaiian politicians
Governors of Maui
Hawaiian military personnel